The R672 road is a regional road in County Waterford, Ireland. It runs from Knockaraha Bridge (north of Ballinamult) southwards to Dungarvan.

References

Regional roads in the Republic of Ireland
Roads in County Waterford